The Salesian Academy of St John Bosco (formerly known as Salesian College Grammar School, Savio Catholic High School and then Savio Salesian College) is a Roman Catholic secondary school in Bootle, Merseyside, England. The school is under the care of the Salesians of Don Bosco, and has about 600 pupils on roll.

History
The school opened in September 1966 as Salesian College Grammar School for Boys, and was the first Roman Catholic grammar school in Bootle, with the first pupils moving to the school on 2 May 1966. The building project began in April 1963 and cost around £398,000. The college was blessed by Rev. Augustine Harris, Auxiliary Bishop of Liverpool.

On 2 December 1971, an explosion in the school's boiler room shook the entire school and nearby houses, with debris crashing onto the school playground. The two boilermen, who were removing oil from the tanks, escaped just seconds before the boiler room was wrecked by "a fierce explosion". The explosion, caused by escaping gases from storage tanks, extensively damaged the boiler room, although the school was able to reopen the following Monday after repairs were undertaken over the weekend.

The school underwent a £2 million refurbishment and rebuilding programme in 1990. Having been established in 1966, the school celebrated its 25th anniversary in September 1991.

In November 1993, the school was listed as having the worst rate of truancy within Merseyside, rating 14th nationally, although teachers disputed the findings by suggesting that the numbers are open to distortion by schools themselves.

The school was successful in early 2006 to secure a bid for specialist Business & Enterprise status.

Previously a voluntary aided school administered by Sefton Council, in February 2023 Savio Salesian College converted to academy status and was renamed The Salesian Academy of St John Bosco. The school is now sponsored by the Pope Francis Multi Academy Trust, but continues to be under the jurisdiction of the Roman Catholic Archdiocese of Liverpool.

Notable former pupils

 Jamie Carragher, former footballer (England national football team, Liverpool F.C.)
 Paul Nuttall, politician (UKIP MEP)
 Alex Greenwood, footballer for Manchester City and the England women's team
 Jack O'Connell, footballer for Sheffield United

References

External links
The Salesian Academy of St John Bosco website

Catholic secondary schools in the Archdiocese of Liverpool
Secondary schools in the Metropolitan Borough of Sefton
Academies in the Metropolitan Borough of Sefton
Educational institutions established in 1966
1966 establishments in England